The Mangawai River is a river of the Northland Region of New Zealand. It flows east into the Wairoa River close to its outflow into the Kaipara Harbour.

See also
List of rivers of New Zealand

References

Kaipara District
Rivers of the Northland Region
Rivers of New Zealand
Kaipara Harbour catchment